Vedanga Jyotisha, or Jyotishavedanga, is one of earliest known Indian texts on astrology (Jyotisha). The extant text is dated to the final centuries BCE, but it may be based on a tradition reaching back to about 700-600 BCE.

The text is foundational to Jyotisha, one of the six Vedanga disciplines. Its author is traditionally named as Lagadha.

Textual history 
The dating of the Vedanga Jyotisha is relevant for the dating of the Vedic texts. The Vedanga Jyotisha describes the winter solstice for the period of ca. 1400 BCE. This description has been used to date the Vedanga Jyotisha. According to Michael Witzel, the question is "whether the description as given in the Jyotisha is also the date of the text in which it is transmitted. It is written in two recensions – Rigveda recensions and Yajurveda recensions. Rigveda recensions and Yajurveda recensions have same verses except for eight additional verses in the Yajurveda's one". T. K. S. Sastry and R. Kochhar suppose that the Vedanga Jyotisha was written in the period that it describes, and therefore propose an early date, between 1370 and 1150 BCE. David Pingree dates the described solstice as about 1180 BCE, but notes that the relevance of this computation to the date of the Vedanga Jyotisha is not evident. The estimation of 1400-1200 BCE has been followed by others, with Subbarayappa adding that the extant form can possibly be from 700-600 BCE.

Other authors propose a later composition. Santanu Chakraverti writes that it has been composed after 700 BCE, while Michael Witzel dates it to the last centuries BCE, based on the style of composing. According to Chakraverti, its description of the winter solstice is correct for ca. 1400 BCE, but not for the time of its composition after 700 BCE. This may be due to the incorporation of late Harappan astronomical knowledge into the Vedic fold, an idea which is also proposed by Subbarayappa. Michael Witzel notes:

Editions 
 Yajus recension, Rk variants and commentary of Somākara Śeṣanāga, edited: Albrecht Weber, Über den Vedakalender Namens Jyotisham, Berlin 1862
 Yajus recension, non-Yajus verses of Rk recension, edited: G. Thibaut, "Contributions to the Explanation of the Jyotisha-Vedánga", Journal of the Asiatic Society Bengal Vol 46 (1877), p. 411-437
Hindi translation: Girja Shankar Shashtri, Jyotisha Karmkanda and Adhyatma Shodh Sansthan, 455 Vasuki Khurd, Daraganj, Allahabad-6.
Sanskrit Commentary with Hindi Translation: Vedā̄ṅgajyotiṣam: Yajurvedināṃ paramparayāgatam vistr̥tasaṃskr̥tabhūmikayā. On Vedic astrology and astronomy; critical edited text with Hindi and Sanskrit commentaries. With appendies including Vedic calendar as described by Lagadha for his time. By Lagadha, Ācārya-Śivarāja Kauṇḍinnyāyana, Pramodavardhana Kaundinnyayana, Sammodavardhana  Kauṇḍinnyāyana, Somākara<ref>{{Cite web | url=https://books.google.com/books?id=SDmSGwAACAAJ |title = Vedā̄ṅgajyotiṣam: Yajurvedināṃ paramparayāgatam vistr̥tasaṃskr̥tabhūmikayā Somākarabhāṣyeṇa Kauṇḍinnyāyanavyākhyānena ca sahitam : Saṅkṣiptahindībhūmikā-Hindyānuvādādiyutaṃ vividhapariśiṣṭavibhūṣitaṃ ca|author1 = Lagadha|year = 2005}}</ref>

References

Sources

External links 
 Vedāṅga jyotiṣa of Lagadha, translated by TSK Sastry, edited by KV Sarma

Hindu astrological texts
Astronomy books
Vedangas
Indian astronomy texts
Ancient Indian astronomical works
Sanskrit texts

hi:लगध
sa:लगध